Nikita Pablo (born 8 January 1995) is an Australian synchronized swimmer. She competed in the women's duet at the 2016 Summer Olympics.

References

1995 births
Living people
Australian synchronised swimmers
Olympic synchronised swimmers of Australia
Synchronized swimmers at the 2016 Summer Olympics
Place of birth missing (living people)
Sportswomen from Queensland
Sportspeople from the Gold Coast, Queensland